Manduk may refer to:
 मण्डूक, manduk (the flower), a word in Hindi to describe the Oroxylum indicum tree
 Manduk, Bangladesh, a place in Chandpur Zl, Chittagong Div (23, 18, 0,N, 91, 0, 0,E)